The Ministry of Social Development of Uruguay (MIDES) is the ministry of the Government of Uruguay that is responsible for proposing, generating and activating national social policies. It is headquartered in the 18 de Julio Avenue in Barrio Cordón, Montevideo. The current Minister of Social Development is Martín Lema, who has held the position since May 3, 2021, after Pablo Bartol was removed from office by the President.

It was created on March 21, 2005, by Emergency Law No. 17,866, 20 days after President Tabaré Vázquez took office. The first minister appointed by the president was Marina Arismendi.

List of Ministers of Social Development

References 

Government ministries of Uruguay
Ministries established in 2005
Social affairs ministries